Teshome Mitiku (born 1949) is an Ethiopian singer and saxophonist. He is the father of Swedish singer Emilia and brother of saxophonist Theodros Mitiku. He was leader of Soul Ekos Band active in 1960s.

Early life
Teshome Mitiku was born in Addis Ababa in 1949. He is the brother of saxophonist Theodros Mitiku and father of Swedish pop and soul singer Emilia. In 1970, he left Ethiopia to Denmark, then Sweden where he got Clinical Psychology. Teshome is now living in Washington D.C.

Career
Teshome started his career in the 1960s during the country's musical Golden Age, accompanied by his appearance in the Either/Orchestra at Chicago Jazz Festival in September. He was a leader of Soul Ekos Band, the first independent musical ensemble recorded in the country. During stay in the group, he released hits like "Gara Sir New Betesh", "Yezemed Yebada", "Mot Adeladlogn" and "Hasabe", all of which were written by himself.

Before settling to the United States in 1990s, Teshome spent over 20 years in Sweden to pursue musical career, and earned degree in sociology, and support his daughter to become a singer.

Discography

References

External links
Teshome Mitiku on SoundCloud
1949 births
20th-century Ethiopian male singers
People from Addis Ababa
Swedish expatriates in Ethiopia
Living people